The Lord Lieutenant of Belfast is the official representative of The King for the 'County Borough of Belfast', Northern Ireland. The current Lord Lieutenant is Dame Fionnuala Mary Jay-O'Boyle, DBE, who was appointed in July 2014. The position was first created in 1900 and was held by The 6th Marquess of Londonderry. The role is largely honorary with the few formal duties relating to liaising with the King's private office in the lead up to visits to the City regarding issues of local concern and the presentation of awards on behalf of the King. The High Sheriff of Belfast is theoretically the King's judicial representative in the city, while the Lord Lieutenant is the Sovereign's personal representative.

List of Lord Lieutenants
The 6th Marquess of Londonderry: 20 February 1900 – 1904
The 9th Earl of Shaftesbury: 19 January 1904 – 1911
The 1st Viscount Pirrie: 4 November 1911 – 6 June 1924
The Rt Hon. Sir Thomas Dixon, 2nd Bt.: 7 July 1924 – 10 May 1950
The 2nd Baron Glentoran: 11 July 1950 – 1985  
Sir Robin Kinahan: 12 August 1985 – 1991
Colonel James Elliott Wilson: 25 March 1991 – 2000
Lady Carswell: 26 May 2000 – 8 August 2009
Dame Mary Peters: 9 August 2009 – 6 July 2014
Dame Fionnuala Mary Jay-O'Boyle: since 6 July 2014

Deputy lieutenants
A deputy lieutenant of Belfast is commissioned by the Lord Lieutenant of Belfast. Deputy lieutenants support the work of the lord-lieutenant. There can be several deputy lieutenants at any time, depending on the population of the county. Their appointment does not terminate with the changing of the lord-lieutenant, but they usually retire at age 75.

21st Century
28 October 2003: Lady Mary Peters, 
9 March 2005: Jennifer Campbell
30 October 2007: Professor Dorota Iwaniec
21 February 2009: Joseph Garth Corbett, 
28 June 2017: Dr Mark Christopher Sheridan

See also
Belfast City Council

References

 
Local government in Belfast
Belfast